203 Hill (in  or in Japanese: 二〇三高地, or in Russian Mount Vysokaya) is a high ground located in Lushunkou District, Dalian, Liaoning Province, China. In 1904-1905, one of the fiercest battles was fought between the Japanese and Russian armies in the Siege of Port Arthur, during the Russo-Japanese War.

In 1993, the Japan-China Friendship Exchange Support Association for Children donated 1,300 cherry blossom trees to Dalian City, which were planted at the foot of the South Peak of 203 Hill. Since 1998, the local area began to hold the annual "Cherry Blossom Journey" event. Since 2005, it has been upgraded to Dalian Lushun Cherry Blossom Festival. 203 Highland Cherry Blossom Garden is one of the venues. In April 2009, the 203 Highland New Cherry Blossom Garden was opened. The new Garden covers an area of more than 500,000 square meters and has more than 3700 cherry blossoms of 18 varieties.

See also
 Dalian
 Lushunkou District
 Russo-Japanese War
 Siege of Port Arthur
 The Battle of Port Arthur

References

Dalian
Russo-Japanese War